The German Chemical Society (German: , GDCh) is a learned society and professional association founded in 1949 to represent the interests of German chemists in local, national and international contexts. GDCh "brings together people working in chemistry and the molecular sciences and supports their striving for positive, sustainable scientific advance – for the good of humankind and the environment, and a future worth living for."

History
The earliest precursor of today's GDCh was the German Chemical Society (DChG).  Adolf von Baeyer was prominent among the German chemists who established DChG in 1867; and August Wilhelm von Hofmann was the first president.  This society was modeled after the British Chemical Society, which was the precursor of the Royal Society of Chemistry. Like its British counterpart, DChG sought to foster the communication of new ideas and facts throughout Germany and across international borders.

In 1946, the current organization was created by a merger of the German Chemical Society (DChG) and the Association of German Chemists (VDCh).

Honorary Members of the GDCh have included Otto Hahn, Robert B. Woodward, Jean-Marie Lehn, George Olah and other eminent scientists.

Activities
Scientific publications of the society include , Angewandte Chemie, Chemistry: A European Journal,  European Journal of Inorganic Chemistry, European Journal of Organic Chemistry, ChemPhysChem, ChemSusChem, ChemBioChem, ChemMedChem, ChemCatChem, ChemistryViews, Chemie Ingenieur Technik and Chemie in unserer Zeit.

In the 21st century, the society has become a member of ChemPubSoc Europe, which is an organization of 16 European chemical societies.  This European consortium was established in the late 1990s as many chemical journals owned by national chemical societies were amalgamated.

Prizes and awards
The society acknowledges individual achievement with prizes and awards, including medals originally conferred by the predecessor organizations DChG and VDCh:
 Hofmann Medal (Hofmann Denkmünze), first awarded to Henri Moissan, 1903
 Liebig Medal (Liebig Denkmünze), first awarded to Adolf von Baeyer, 1903
 Gmelin-Beilstein Medal (Gmelin-Beilstein Denkmünze), first awarded to Paul Walden and Maximilian Pflücke, 1954
 Meyer-Galow Award For Business Chemistry (Der Meyer-Galow-Preis für Wirtschaftschemie), first awarded to Susanne Röhrig, 2012 .

See also
 List of chemistry societies
 Royal Society of Chemistry, 1841 
 Société Chimique de France, 1857 
 American Chemical Society, 1876 
 Chemical Society of Japan, 1878

Notes

External links
 Gesellschaft Deutscher Chemiker;  English website

Organizations established in 1867
Chemistry education
1949 establishments in Germany
Scientific organizations established in 1949
Society of German Chemists
Scientific societies based in Germany